Gomtipur is an area located in Ahmedabad, India. There are two heritage place in this area one is Bibiji Masjid Jhulta Minara and second is Mariyam Bibi Masjid. Bibiji Masjid Jhulta Minara is famous for World Heritage Place in UNESCO.

References

Neighbourhoods in Ahmedabad